Vani is a Hindu/Sanskrit Indian feminine given name, which comes from the name of the Goddess Saraswati. The name means 'eloquent in words'. Alternative spelling includes Vaani.

Notable people with the name 

 Vani (writer) (born 1912), Kannada writer
 Vani Bhojan (born 1988), Indian film actress
 Vani Ganapathy, Indian classical dancer
 Vani Hari (born 1979), American blogger
 Vani Harikrishna, Indian film playback singer and music director
 Vani Jairam (born 1945), Indian singer
 Vaani Kapoor (born 1988), Indian film actress
 Vani Kapoor, Indian golfer
 Vani Kola, a venture capitalist
 Vani Sri (born 1948), Indian actress and politician
 Vani Tripathi (born 1979), Indian actress and politician
 Vani Viswanath born (1971), Indian actress and politician

Hindu given names
Indian feminine given names